John Millard Campbell (September 13, 1907 – April 24, 1995) was an American professional baseball pitcher. He played in Major League Baseball for one season (1933) with the Washington Senators.  For his career, he appeared in one game and pitched one inning, allowing an unearned run.

An alumnus of the University of Alabama, he was born in Washington, D.C. and died in Daytona Beach, Florida at the age of 87.

External links

1907 births
1995 deaths
Washington Senators (1901–1960) players
Major League Baseball pitchers
Baseball players from Washington, D.C.
Birmingham Barons players
Reading Keystones players
Albany Senators players
Los Angeles Angels (minor league) players
San Francisco Seals (baseball) players
Seattle Indians players
Charlotte Hornets (baseball) players
Williamsport Grays players
Syracuse Chiefs players
Tulsa Oilers (baseball) players
Knoxville Smokies players
New Orleans Pelicans (baseball) players
Alabama Crimson Tide baseball players